Alayna Marie Morgan (May 21, 1948 – November 7, 2009) was an American woman from Santa Rosa, California, who was renowned as one of the world's heaviest people, weighing an estimated 700lbs (50 stone) at her peak weight. She was once featured in an episode of Supersize vs Superskinny programmed by Channel 4.

Early life
Morgan had a strained relationship with her father, and was sexually abused as a child and young adult. She developed a wide range of eating disorders such as bulimia, which she developed when she was 8 years old.

See also
 List of the heaviest people

References
 Alayna Morgan Obituary - Santa Rosa, California - Tributes.com
 Woman Barely Survives as Prisoner in Her Own Body
 Lakeland Ledger - Google News Archive Search

1948 births
2009 deaths
Obesity in the United States
People from Santa Rosa, California